West Kortright Presbyterian Church is a historic Presbyterian church located at 49 W. Kortright Church Road in West Kortright, Delaware County, New York. It is a wood-frame building on a stone foundation surmounted by a broad gable roof.  It was originally constructed in 1850 and substantially renovated in 1890s.

In 1975, local residents vowed to save the West Kortright Presbyterian Church, with its beautiful stained glass windows, kerosene chandeliers, and rich woodwork and the church began its second life of service. Now a Historic Landmark, the Greek Revival structure became home to The West Kortright Centre, a not-for-profit organization dedicated to excellence in arts programming and presentation.

It was added to the National Register of Historic Places in 2002.

See also
National Register of Historic Places listings in Delaware County, New York

References

Presbyterian churches in New York (state)
Churches on the National Register of Historic Places in New York (state)
National Register of Historic Places in Delaware County, New York
Georgian architecture in New York (state)
Churches completed in 1850
19th-century Presbyterian church buildings in the United States
Churches in Delaware County, New York